WJOL (1340 AM) is a radio station broadcasting a news talk/sports format. Licensed to Joliet, Illinois, United States, the station is currently owned by Alpha Media, through licensee Alpha Media Licensee LLC. WJOL carries a variety of local programming, as well as nationally syndicated shows.  WJOL's studios are located in Crest Hill, and its transmitter is in Joliet.

History
The station began broadcasting in May 1925, and originally held the call sign WJBI. The station was originally owned by Harold M. Couch. Later that year, the station was sold to the parent company of the Boston Store (a Joliet-based store unrelated to the Wisconsin Boston Stores), and its call sign was changed to WCLS, which stood for "Will County's Largest Store". The station originally broadcast at 1400 kHz, running 150 watts. In 1927, the station's frequency was changed to 1390 kHz. In 1928 its frequency was changed to 1310 kHz, and its power was reduced to 100 watts. The station operated a limited number of hours, and shared time on its frequency with other stations.

In 1940, the station began operating 24 hours a day. In 1941, the station's frequency was changed to 1340 kHz, and its power was increased to 250 watts. In 1945, the station's call sign was changed to WJOL. In 1962, the station's daytime power was increased to 1,000 watts. In the early 1960s, the station went into a Top 40 format and published a local top 50 record chart. In early 1985, the station's nighttime power was increased to 1,000 watts. At the time, the station aired an adult contemporary format. During the 1990's, it aired formats of news/talk, oldies, and classic hits. It became a full-time news/talk station by 2001.

WJOL alumni
Notable radio personalities that have worked at WJOL include Frank O'Leary, Don Ladas, Bill Drilling, Art Hellyer, Bob Zak, Don Beno, Tony Ray, Ralph Sherman Sr., Jerry Halasz, Max Carey, Ron Gleason, Joe Tippett, John Dempsey, Bob Wheeler and Ruth Stevens, who did a radio show from her record shop and was the first black woman on the station.  While working at the station during its WCLS era, sportscaster Harry Caray adopted his on-air professional name which he would use for the rest of his career.

From 1947-1950, novelist William Johnston worked as a news reporter for WJOL.

References

External links

WJOL's website

JOL
News and talk radio stations in the United States
Alpha Media radio stations
Radio stations established in 1925
1925 establishments in Illinois